Ḥ-R-M (Modern) is the triconsonantal root of many Semitic words, and many of those words are used as names. The basic meaning expressed by the root translates as "forbidden".

Arabic

Names
Al-Masjid al-Ḥarām; "The Holy Mosque" – the mosque surrounding the Kaaba in Mecca
Al-Bayṫ al-Ḥarām ("The Holy House"); the Kaaba
Muḥarram ("Holy Month"); the first month of the Islamic calendar
Al-Ḥaram ash-Sharîf ("The Greatly Holy"); the Temple Mount (on which is located Al-Aqsa Mosque) in Jerusalem

Concepts
Maḥram ("forbidden", "unmarriageable (kinsman)", also "no need to cover" (see also sartorial hijab), or an unforbidden person within the family)
Iḥrâm; Hajj cloth, and the state of ritual consecration
Ḥarīm ("Forbidden place"); women's area in a house, forbidden for non-Mahram men
Ḥarām; ritually impure, or a forbidden food
Ḥaram; sanctuary

Hebrew and Aramaic concepts
Ḥerem or Cherem (pl. Ḥāremōṫ or Ḥarāmôṫ); a term with several applications
Haḥrāmah; Confiscation (civil law)

See also
Holiest sites in Islam
List of characters and names mentioned in the Quran
Middle East

References

Triconsonantal roots